Lorry-lès-Metz (literally Lorry near Metz) is a commune in the Moselle department in Grand Est in north-eastern France.

See also
 Communes of the Moselle department

References

External links

 https://www.lorrylesmetz.fr/

Lorrylesmetz
Duchy of Bar